Bronson Wayne Heflin (born August 29, 1971) is an American former professional baseball pitcher, who played in Major League Baseball (MLB) for the 1996 Philadelphia Phillies.

Heflin was drafted by the Phillies in the 37th round (1,038th overall) of the 1994 Major League Baseball draft.

References

External links

Bronson Heflin at Pura Pelota (Venezuelan Professional Baseball League)

1971 births
Living people
Arkansas Travelers players
Baseball players from Tennessee
Batavia Clippers players
Clearwater Phillies players
Madison Black Wolf players
Major League Baseball pitchers
Memphis Redbirds players
Nashville Sounds players
People from Clarksville, Tennessee
Philadelphia Phillies players
Reading Phillies players
Scranton/Wilkes-Barre Red Barons players
Tennessee Volunteers baseball players
Tiburones de La Guaira players
American expatriate baseball players in Venezuela